Wahidi Bir Ali, or the Wahidi Sultanate of Bir Ali  , was one of several Wahidi states in the British Aden Protectorate and the Protectorate of South Arabia. Its capital was Bi'r `Ali on the Gulf of Aden coast. The last Sultan, Alawi ibn Salih ibn Ahmad Al Wahidi, was deposed and the state was abolished in 1967 upon the founding of the People's Republic of South Yemen. The area is now part of the Republic of Yemen.

History
The predecessor state, the Wahidi Sultanate (Saltanat al-Wahidiyya), was established at an uncertain date.
In 1830 the Wahidi Sultanate split into four states: 
 Wahidi Sultanate of Ba´l Haf (Saltanat Ba al-Haf al-Wahidiyya) 
 Wahidi Sultanate of `Azzan (Saltanat `Azzan al-Wahidiyya) 
 Wahidi Sultanate of Bi´r `Ali `Amaqin  (Saltanat Bi'r `Ali `Amaquin al-Wahidiyya) 
 Wahidi Sultanate of Habban (Saltanat Habban al-Wahidiyya) 
On 4 May 1881 Ba´l Haf and `Azzan joined. In 1888 the Wahidi Sultanate of Ba´l Haf and `Azzan became a British protectorate. 
In 1895 Bi´r `Ali `Amaqin also came under British protection. On 23 Oct 1962 the joint sultanate was renamed Wahidi Sultanate (al-Saltana al-Wahidiyya), while Bi´r `Ali and Habban remained subordinate sultanates. 
On 29 Nov 1967 with the independence of the People's Republic of South Yemen all states were abolished.

Rulers
The Sultans of the Wahidi Sultanate of Bi´r `Ali `Amaqin had the style of Sultan Bi'r `Ali `Amaqi al-Wahidi.

Sultans
1830 - 18..                `Abd Allah ibn Talib al-Wahidi 
1842 - 1875                al-Hadi ibn Talib al-Wahidi 
1875 - 1880                Talib ibn al-Hadi al-Wahidi 
1880 - Mar 1893            Muhsin ibn Salih al-Wahidi 
1893 - 1916                Salih ibn Ahmad al-Wahidi 
1916 - 1940                Nasir ibn Talib al-Wahidi 
1940 - 1955                `Alawi ibn Muhsin al-Wahidi 
1955 - 23 Oct 1962         `Alawi ibn Salih al-Wahidi (continued as subordinate ruler until 29 Nov 1967)

See also
Aden Protectorate

References

External links
Map of Arabia (1905-1923) including the states of Aden Protectorate

19th-century establishments in Yemen
States in the Aden Protectorate
Protectorate of South Arabia
1830 establishments in Asia
Former sultanates